The name David has been used for four tropical cyclones worldwide, once each in the: Atlantic Ocean (where it was retired from use after 1979), Australian region of the South Pacific Ocean, South-West Indian Ocean, and Western Pacific Ocean. It has also been used by Météo France for one extratropical European windstorm.

In the Atlantic:
 Hurricane David (1979), a Category 5 hurricane that made landfall in the Dominican Republic and later in both Florida and Georgia, causing over 2,000 deaths people along its path.

In the Australian region:
 Cyclone David (1976), a Category 3 severe tropical cyclone (Australian scale) that made landfall in Queensland.

In the South-West Indian:
 Tropical Storm David (2009), whose remnants brought heavy rain to the islands of Mauritius and Réunion.

In the Western Pacific:
 Typhoon David (1997) (21W), a Category 2 typhoon that remained over the open ocean.

In Europe:
 Storm David (2017) (Friederike in Germany), brought hurricane-force gusts, rain and severe snowfall particularly to central Europe, creating blizzard conditions in some areas.

Atlantic hurricane set index articles
Australian region cyclone set index articles
Pacific typhoon set index articles
South-West Indian Ocean cyclone set index articles